Patriots is a 1937 German film directed by Karl Ritter.

Plot

Cast 
Mathias Wieman as Peter Thomann, called Pierre
Lída Baarová as Thérèse, called Jou-Jou
Bruno Hübner as Jules Martin, director of a front-line theatre
Hilde Körber as Suzanne
Paul Dahlke as Charles
Nicolas Koline as Nikita
Kurt Seifert as Alphonse
Edwin Juergenssen as commandant
Willi Rose as desk officer
Ewald Wenck as police officer
Otz Tollen as judge in wartime court
Ernst Karchow as prosecutor
André Saint-Germain as defending counsel
Lutz Götz as German POW
Paul Schwed as German POW
Karl Hannemann as janitor
Gustav Mahnke as sergeant

External links 

1937 films
Films of Nazi Germany
1930s German-language films
Films directed by Karl Ritter
German black-and-white films
German World War I films
Films set in France
Films about shot-down aviators
German war drama films
1937 war films
German romantic drama films
1937 romantic drama films
UFA GmbH films
1930s German films